Ganderbal is a town and a municipality committee in Ganderbal district in the Indian union territory of Jammu and Kashmir. It is the headquarters of Ganderbal district.It is in Central Kashmir, it has an average elevation of 1,619 metres (5,312 feet). It is bordered by district Srinagar in the south, Bandipore to the north, Kargil in the northeast, Anantnag to the south-east and Baramulla in the south-west.The current District Magistrate of Ganderbal is Mr. Shyambir Singh.District Ganderbal is known for its beauty,there are many beautiful places in Ganderbal.Sonmarg is the most famous place in Ganderbal, Shri Amarnath Ji Yatra is also done in Ganderbal.

Geography
It has an average elevation of 1,619 metres (5,312 feet) above sea level. It is bordered by the Srinagar district in the south, Bandipore to the north, Kargil in the northeast, Anantnag to the southeast. It is divided into six Tehsils viz, Ganderbal, Kangan, Lar, Tulmulla, Gund and Wakoora.

Power project
The Sind River, a major tributary to the Jehlum River flows through this district. The water of the river is mainly used for irrigation, and generation of hydroelectricity. There are three hydroelectric power stations, Lower Sindh Hydroelectric Power Project Ganderbal, Upper Sindh Hydroelectric Power Project 1st Kangan and Upper Sindh Hydroelectric Power Project 2nd Sumbal generating electricity on the Sind River. Besides, the water of the river is used for drinking by Srinagar city through Rangil Water Treatment Plant.

Tourism
Water rafting tournaments are being organised at the tourist destination of Sonamarg every year, to boost the tourism industry of Kashmir valley. Besides Manasbal lake, Gangabal Lake at the foot of Mount Haramukh is one of the destinations of foreign tourists visiting the valley. Vaishnosar Lake and Gadsar Lake are situated north of Sonamarg.

Development
Despite the fact that in the past Ganderbal has remained CM's constituency, it is quite behind in development as compared to other districts. Now Ganderbal constituency is represented by Sheikh Ishfaq Jabbar who defeated qazi afzal by a little margin of 461 votes in recently held state assembly elections 2014. The State government has not shown seriousness towards the development of the district. The only Central University of Kashmir Valley is being constructed in district Ganderbal. One Faculty, the Faculty of Forestry of Sher-e-Kashmir University of Agricultural Sciences and Technology of Kashmir is under construction at Benhama, with the objective to boost the economy and education of the district, which is well behind at present. Besides, there is a stadium which holds a record of playing a day-night matches
Physical education college, the only one in the state, is situated at {Gadoora Ganderbal} some 3.5  km away from district headquarters.

Demographics

 India census, Ganderbal had a population of 297446. Males constitute 53.36% of the population and females 46.64%. Ganderbal has an average literacy rate of 58.04%, lower than the national average of 74.04%: male literacy is 68.85%, and female literacy is 45.71%. In Ganderbal, 17.01% of the population is under 6 years of age.

Politics
The Municipal Committee Ganderbal is an Urban Local Body with 17 elected members. Its last elections took place on 16 October 2018.

Keys:

Education
There is a Physical Education College Located at Gadoora Village, a Sainik School Mansbal, Industrial Training Institute, a Degree college and many higher secondary schools. In addition, a polytechnic college has been recently constructed in the lands of hoakersar and its current status is active. The under-construction Central University of Kashmir in Ganderbal is at Tullamula also class work started at main campus and different government accommodations at different places. Since 1 April 2007 Ganderbal is now a district carved out from Srinagar. 
there is a newly created engineering college namely GCET govt college of engineering and technology Safapora Ganderbal (under construction). There are also three faculties of SKUAST-K namely Faculty of veterinary Science and AH Shuhama Alusteng, Faculty of Forestry Benihama, Faculty of Fisheries Rangil in the district.

Transport

Road
Ganderbal is well-connected by road to other places in Jammu and Kashmir and India by the NH 1.

Rail
Ganderbal is not connected with railways. The nearest railway station is Srinagar railway station located at a distance of 31 kilometres.

Air
The nearest airport is Srinagar International Airport located at a distance of 30 kilometres.

See also
Gogjigund
Sonamarg
Wakura
Gadoora

References

Cities and towns in Ganderbal district